Great Britain, represented by the British Olympic Association (BOA), competed in the 2010 Winter Olympics in Vancouver, British Columbia, Canada and sent a team of selected athletes was officially known as Team GB. The team was made up of athletes from the whole United Kingdom including Northern Ireland, whose athletes may elect to hold Irish citizenship, allowing them to represent either Great Britain or Ireland. Additionally some British overseas territories compete separately from Britain in Olympic competition.

Great Britain sent a delegation of fifty athletes to compete in eleven sports and were led by Andy Hunt as Chef de Mission, but despite being set a target of three medals by UK Sport, the team won just one, Amy Williams' gold in the women's skeleton, and finished 19th in the medal table.

Medallists

The following British competitors won medals at the Games. In the discipline sections below, medalists' names are in bold. All results are taken from the official Vancouver 2010 website.

Targets

UK Sport, the organisation responsible for distributing National Lottery funding to elite sport, set Team GB a target of winning three medals, of any colour, at the Vancouver Games; two more than the single silver medal won in Turin by Shelley Rudman. If achieved this would have been the best performance by a British Winter Olympics team since 1936 when a gold, silver and bronze medal were won. The target was set following £6.5 million of funding in the four years leading up to the Games. Whilst no particular events were targeted as potential sources of medals, the success of British athletes in the previous four years was taken into account when setting the target; the men's curling team and the two-woman bobsleigh team, Nicola Minichiello and Gillian Cooke, won world championships, and in 2008 Kristan Bromley became the first man in the history of bob skeleton to win the World Championship, European Championship and World Cup in the same year.

The preparations of Britain's skiers and snowboarders for the Games were hampered by the financial problems of the British Ski and Snowboard Federation (BSSF), operating under the name Snowsport GB, which was responsible for administering the lottery funds received through UK Sport. In August 2009 the BSFF was £300,000 in debt and a number of British skiers, including medal hope Chemmy Alcott, were forced to fund their own summer training camps in New Zealand and Chile. On 5 February 2010, just a week before the opening ceremony of the Games, it was announced that BSSF had entered administration after the Royal Bank of Scotland withdrew the organisation's overdraft facility. This put the participation of British skiers in doubt, as a governing body is a necessity for Olympic competition, but the British Olympic Association (BOA) revived a subsidiary company to take over. The financial difficulties suffered by Alcott, partly as a result of the BSSF collapse, led her to consider her future in the sport at the end of the Games.

On 25 February, having finished 19th overall in the medal table, and 14th out of European countries, head of Team GB Andy Hunt said that despite not reaching UK Sport's target the team "have achieved what we set out to do" by bettering their performance in the 2006 Games.  This was in reference to Amy Williams' gold in the women's skeleton, which was the sole medal won by the team.

Steve Redgrave, vice-president of the BOA, added "I don't think there is a sense of disappointmentI think there is a sense of celebration of winning that gold medal. I would take one gold medal over five bronze medals any day." Hunt also announced that the BOA would conduct a strategic review of funding and may support the channeling of more funds towards realistic medal hopes.

Alpine skiing

Four British athletes competed in alpine skiing events at the Games. Andy Noble and David Ryding qualified for two events each whilst Ed Drake and Chemmy Alcott, taking part in her third Olympics, qualified for all five variants. The preparations of Britain's skiers were disrupted by the collapse of Snowsport GB, but all athletes were able to enter the games after the intervention of the British Olympic Association. Alcott, considered a realistic contender for a medal, achieved the squad's best finish coming eleventh in the women's combined.
Men

Women

Biathlon

Britain sent a single biathlete to the Games; Lee-Steve Jackson was the first British competitor to qualify for the Olympic pursuit and finished in 56th position. He also took part in the individual and sprint events.

Bobsleigh

Britain sent eight athletes to compete in the bobsleigh events with entries in the two-man, four-man and two-woman competitions. Allyn Condon competed in the four-man event having previously taken part in the 4 x 100 m relay at the 2000 Summer Olympics in Sydney; the first Briton to take part in both a Summer and Winter Games since Marcus Adam. In the two-man the British pairing of Dan Money and John Jackson suffered a crash on their first run; they escaped serious injury, but were disqualified for failing to complete the run.

Nicola Minichiello and Gillian Cooke went into the two-woman event as the reigning world champions and after two of four runs were placed tenth, one position ahead of Paula Walker and Kelly Thomas. On the third run Minichiello and Cooke lost control, resulting in them crossing the finishing line with their sled on its side, and the pair withdrew from the competition before the final run.

Cumulative time and standings given in brackets.

Cross-country skiing

Three British cross-country skiers went to the Games, all three were competing in their first Olympics. Andrew Young and Andrew Musgrave, aged seventeen and nineteen, entered the team sprint
in addition to their individual events but were forced to withdraw as Young, suffering from a cold, was unable to complete his leg.

Men

Women

Curling

Curling events at the 2010 Winter Olympics were in the form of a round-robin tournament; each nation played all others in a group stage with the top four qualifying for medal playoffs. The men's team, the reigning world champions, won group stage games against France, Denmark, China, United States and Germany. These five wins left them in a tie for the last semifinal place with Sweden, who beat them in their group game. A single tiebreaker match was played between the two sides which was won by the Swedes in the first extra end. The women's team, skippered by 19-year-old Eve Muirhead, entered the tournament ranked seventh in the world and beat world champions China in their opening match, but won just two of their remaining eight games to finish seventh in the group and miss out on the semifinals.

Men's tournament

Men's team
Lockerbie CC (curling club), Lockerbie
Skip:  David Murdoch
Third: Ewan MacDonald
Second:  Peter Smith
Lead:  Euan Byers
Alternate: Graeme Connal

Results
Round-robin

Draw 1

Draw 3

Draw 4

Draw 5

Draw 7

Draw 8

Draw 9

Draw 11

Draw 12

Tiebreaker
Having finished level with Sweden with five wins Great Britain faced a single match tiebreaker to decide who advanced to the semifinals.

Standings

Women's tournament

Women's team
Skip: Eve Muirhead
Third: Jackie Lockhart
Second: Kelly Wood
Lead: Lorna Vevers
Alternate: Anne Laird

Results

Draw 2

Draw 3

Draw 4

Draw 5

Draw 6

Draw 7

Draw 8

Draw 10

Draw 11

Standings

Figure skating

Great Britain had qualified seven athletes; one in ladies singles, one pair in the pairs skating, and two pairs in ice dancing. The team was announced as Jenna McCorkell in the ladies singles, Stacey Kemp and David King in the pairs and in the ice dancing Sinead Kerr and John Kerr, and Penny Coomes and Nicholas Buckland. Brother and sister pairing Sinead and John Kerr were considered medal contenders before the Games as they entered the event ranked fifth in the world. The pair, who came third in the 2009 European Championships, went on to finish eighth.

Freestyle skiing 

Three British women competed in freestyle skiing events, one each in the aerials, moguls and ski cross. Sarah Sauvey became the first Briton to compete in Olympic ski cross, as the sport was making its debut in Vancouver. She finished 34th in the qualifying rounds missing out on the medal rounds by two places.

Women's - Aerials and Moguls

Women's Ski cross

Luge

Britain's sole competitor in luge was Adam Rosen, an American-born athlete who had previously competed at the 2006 Games. The 25-year-old's 16th-place finished equalled his performance in Turin and was just one place off of the highest Winter Olympic finish by any British luger.

Cumulative time and standings given in brackets.

Short track speed skating

Britain qualified six athletes in individual short track speed skating events. In the men's events four skaters competed, with Anthony Douglas and Jon Eley each racing at two distances; a team also qualified for the relay event. Eley achieved the squad's best individual finish, coming sixth in 500 metres, a position matched by the relay team. In the women's events Elise Christie raced in the 500, 1000 and 1500 metres and Sarah Lindsay also took part in the 500 metres but was disqualified in her heat following a clash with Canada's Jessica Gregg.

Men

Women

Key: Q=Qualified for next round, QB=Qualified for B final

Skeleton

Four British athletes qualified for the skeleton events. Amy Williams won Britain's only medal of the Games, a gold in the women's skeleton. Williams became the first British gold medalist in an individual event at the Winter Olympics for thirty years, following Robin Cousins' victory in figure skating at the 1980 Winter Olympics in Lake Placid, and the first British female individual Winter Olympics gold medalist since Jeannette Altwegg in 1952. Shelley Rudman, Britain's only medalist at the 2006 Olympics, finished sixth in the women's event and her fiancé, Kristan Bromley, finished in the same position in the men's event.

Cumulative time and standings given in brackets.

Key: * New track records

Snowboarding

Four British snowboarders qualified for the Games. Ben Kilner qualified 7th and progressed through the semifinals, however finished 18th in the Final for the Men's halfpipe. Reserve Marcijan Harasymiw crashed on his second run and did not advance due to injury. Zoe Gillings reached the semifinals of the women's snowboard cross and finished in eighth position overall. 
Halfpipe

Parallel giant slalom

Snowboard cross

See also
 Great Britain at the 2010 Winter Paralympics

References

External links
Olympic Schedule and Results at Official Vancouver 2010 website

Winter Olympics
2010
Nations at the 2010 Winter Olympics
Winter sports in the United Kingdom